St. Cornelia's Episcopal Church is a historic church on the Lower Sioux Indian Reservation near Morton, Minnesota, United States.  It was built 1889–91 for a Dakota congregation returning after years of exile from Minnesota following the Dakota War of 1862.  It is also an example of the Episcopal missionary work among Native Americans and fine Gothic Revival church construction under Bishop Henry Benjamin Whipple (1822–1901).  St. Cornelia's was added to the National Register of Historic Places in 1979.  It was listed for having state-level significance in architecture, exploration/settlement, and religion.

See also
 National Register of Historic Places listings in Redwood County, Minnesota

References

External links
 Bishop Whipple Mission

19th-century Episcopal church buildings
Buildings and structures in Redwood County, Minnesota
Churches completed in 1891
Dakota culture
Episcopal church buildings in Minnesota
Gothic Revival church buildings in Minnesota
Churches on the National Register of Historic Places in Minnesota
1891 establishments in Minnesota
National Register of Historic Places in Redwood County, Minnesota
Santee Dakota